The Hellyer River is a perennial river located in north western Tasmania, Australia.

The river flows for  before joining into the Arthur River.  High quality cool temperate rainforest and tall eucalyptus forest grows along much of the river. Significant species include Myrtle Beech, Leatherwood, Southern Sassafras and Messmate. The river in named in honour of the explorer Henry Hellyer.

See also

Rivers of Tasmania

References

Rivers of Tasmania